The 1971–72 season was the 88th football season in which Dumbarton competed at a Scottish national level, entering the Scottish Football League, the Scottish Cup and the Scottish League Cup. In addition Dumbarton competed in the Drybrough Cup and the Stirlingshire Cup.

Scottish Second Division

After fifty years of trying, Dumbarton at last gained promotion back to the top flight of Scottish League football, by winning the Division 2 title - their first national championship win in 60 years.  However, it was not all plain sailing. With just 3 points from the first 6 games, all was not looking good at the start of the campaign, but a single defeat in the next 14 games put Dumbarton back on track.  When the final game arrived against Berwick Rangers, only a win could secure the championship, while a draw would confirm promotion, with a defeat consigning Dumbarton to another season in the lower division.  All went well in front of a massive 9,000 home crowd - a 4-2 win being recorded and First Division football next season.

Scottish League Cup

The League Cup at the start of the season was, for some unknown reason, a complete disaster.  After the previous season's success and a full squad to choose from, Dumbarton were unable to bring about a repeat, and with a single win and a draw from the six sectional games, there was to be no further interest in the competition.

Scottish Cup

In the Scottish Cup, Dumbarton lost out to Raith Rovers in the fourth round.

Drybrough Cup
The season commenced with a new sponsored competition - the Drybrough Cup - played for by the four top scoring sides from the two divisions in the previous season.  As top scorers in the Second Division, Dumbarton were matched up against the First Division's top scorers, Celtic in the first round, and it was the Glasgow side who advanced to the next round.

Stirlingshire Cup
Locally, in the Stirlingshire Cup, Dumbarton were knocked out in the first round by Alloa Athletic, on penalties after a drawn game.

Friendlies

Player statistics

Squad 

|}

Source:

Transfers
Amongst those players joining and leaving the club were the following:

Players in

Players out 

Source:

Reserve team
For the second season running, Dumbarton competed in the Combined Reserve League.  Results were mixed and as with the previous season, reporting of results was scarce, nonetheless it is known that the league was never competed.

References

Dumbarton F.C. seasons
Scottish football clubs 1971–72 season